Camarones is the plural Spanish form of camarón, meaning "shrimp", and may refer to several places:
 Camarones, Chile, a commune in Chile
 Caleta Camarones, a town in Chile
 Camarones, Chubut, a town in Argentina
 Camarones metro station, a metro station in Mexico City
 Camarones, Colombia, a precinct in Colombia
 Camarones, Guaynabo, Puerto Rico